2006 Hong Kong–Shanghai Inter Club Championship is officially the 1st staging of Hong Kong-Shanghai Inter Club Championship. Buler Rangers represented Hong Kong to compete by topping the league after the first half of the season  while Shanghai Shenhua represented Shanghai.

Shanghai Shenhua lifted the first trophy of this competition after winning 1-0.

Rules
 A draw would directly lead to penalty shootout rather than an extra time
 Each team can only have a maximum of 4 foreign players on the field.

Squads

Some of the players include:

Shanghai Shenhua
  Li Weifeng
  Du Wei
  Gao Lin
  Sun Xiang
  Xiao Zhanbo

Buler Rangers
  Zhang Chunhui
  Yip Chi Ho
  Fofo Agbo

Result

References

Shan
Hong Kong–Shanghai Inter Club Championship